"Public Enemy No. 1" is a song by American heavy metal band Megadeth, written by Dave Mustaine. It is the first single and second track from their thirteenth studio album Thirteen, which was released on November 1, 2011. The song was commercially released as a single on September 13, 2011, which was Mustaine's 50th birthday. A music video for the song was released on November 5, 2011.

Performances
The song debuted live in Hamburg, Germany on July 4, 2011, prior to its release as a single.

On October 31 (Halloween), 2011, the band performed the song on the American late-night talk show Jimmy Kimmel Live!. As it was a Halloween edition of the show, the band members were almost unrecognizable, dressed in full costume: Dave Mustaine as Frankenstein's monster, David Ellefson as a werewolf, Chris Broderick as the Phantom of the Opera and Shawn Drover as a Bela Lugosi-style Dracula.
The band also performed "Symphony of Destruction", but only a small portion aired over the ending credits. The full performance was made available for view exclusively on the Jimmy Kimmel Live! website.

Lyrical meaning
Mustaine has said that "Public Enemy No. 1" was written about 1920s gangster Al Capone. The inspiration was a possible haunting incident while the band was recording in an old building in Tennessee, which Mustaine described as being a "hideaway" of Capone's.

Music video
On September 20, 2011, David Ellefson announced that the band was filming a Western-themed music video for the song in Valencia, California. The video includes live animals and footage of the band. The video was released on November 4, 2011.

Critical reception
Graham Hartmann of Loudwire gave the single three-and-a-half stars out of five, commenting that the song follows the standard Megadeth formula: "aggressive thrash and blistering guitar work", combined with Mustaine's "somewhat" clean vocals.

Track listing
CD single
 "Public Enemy No. 1" (Radio Edit) – 3:57
 "Public Enemy No. 1" – 4:15

Charts

Personnel 
 Megadeth
 Dave Mustaine – guitars, vocals, 1st and 3rd guitar solos
 Chris Broderick – guitars, 2nd and 4th guitar solos
 David Ellefson – bass
 Shawn Drover – drums, percussion

 Production
 Produced by Johnny K
 Music and Lyrics – Dave Mustaine, Johnny K

References

External links 
 

Megadeth songs
2011 singles
Songs written by Dave Mustaine
Song recordings produced by Johnny K
2011 songs